SpongeBob's Truth or Square (also known as Stuck in the Freezer) is a 2009 made-for-television comedy special and an hour-long episode of the American animated television series SpongeBob SquarePants that was produced as the 123rd and 124th episodes of the series. The special originally aired on Nickelodeon in the United States on November 6, 2009, celebrating the tenth anniversary of the television series. This is the second SpongeBob SquarePants television film, following SpongeBob's Atlantis SquarePantis. Its animation was directed by supervising director Alan Smart, Andrew Overtoom and Tom Yasumi.

In the special, SpongeBob and his friends are accidentally locked inside the Krusty Krab on the day of its "Eleventy-Seventh" anniversary celebration. As they crawl through the ventilation system trying to escape, they look back on shared memories through flashback moments. Meanwhile, Patchy the Pirate is holding a TV Extravaganza, and is waiting for SpongeBob to show up to it, but with no reply, Patchy sets out to Bikini Bottom in a fit of rage.

Truth or Square was written by Luke Brookshier, Nate Cash, Steven Banks, and Paul Tibbitt. Guest stars include Rosario Dawson, Eddie Deezen, Triumph the Insult Comic Dog, LeBron James, Tina Fey, Will Ferrell, Craig Ferguson, Robin Williams, and P!nk, with Ricky Gervais having an uncredited voice cameo as the narrator. Upon release, the special attracted an estimated 7.7 million viewers, but was met with mixed reviews from critics; although some generally spoke positively of the special's main animated segments, most criticized the Patchy the Pirate segments, which were described as unfunny and filler.

Plot
SpongeBob SquarePants, a yellow sponge, wakes up and realizes that the Krusty Krab is celebrating its "Eleventy-Seventh" anniversary. He remembers his first visit to the Krusty Krab and tells Gary the Snail, a sea snail, all about it. SpongeBob then leaves to go to the Krusty Krab, but as soon as he exits his house, he bumps into the back of a long line of customers waiting to get into the restaurant as well. SpongeBob jumps on top of every customer in the line, eventually reaching the restaurant.

Mr. Krabs, a red greedy crab tells SpongeBob and Squidward Tentacles, a turquoise squid that it is a perfect opportunity for his business rival,  Sheldon J. Plankton, to steal the Krabby Patty formula. Mr. Krabs has hired Patrick Star, a pink starfish as a security guard, so he does not have to pay for a real one, and SpongeBob spectacularly decorates the Krusty Krab with ketchup, toilet paper, and mustard. Patrick, Squidward, and Mr. Krabs follow SpongeBob into the freezer, where he shows them a giant Krabby Patty ice sculpture that he made himself. However, in an attempt to take the ice sculpture outside, they accidentally trap themselves inside the freezer. Mr. Krabs remembers that there is a way to escape without using the door, which is through the ventilation system. While finding their way through the maze of air vents, they look back at some memorable moments in their lives.

To get out of the air shaft, SpongeBob molds Squidward, Patrick, and Mr. Krabs into a battering ram to bust out of the shaft, and he finally makes it out, only to find that all the customers have left after waiting for so long without getting any food. Mr. Krabs is heartbroken, but SpongeBob manages to summon all the customers back as he sings a song called "O Krusty Krab". Meanwhile, Plankton finds the perfect opportunity to steal the Krabby Patty secret formula. He fails, having been caught by Mr. Krabs. The "Eleventy-Seventh" anniversary celebration then goes ahead.

Throughout the special, Patchy the Pirate attempts to hold a celebration of the tenth anniversary of when he started the SpongeBob fan club, and attempts to bring in SpongeBob himself.  When Patchy is told SpongeBob is not coming, he vows to get him by any means necessary. He travels to Bikini Bottom, but ends up getting eaten by a whale. Inside the whale, he watches some old tapes of the show before the whale sneezes him out, sending him flying back to the studio, where he dreams of meeting SpongeBob. He wakes up and decides he will never meet his hero, but his guests assure him otherwise, causing him to faint again.

Cast

Production

Production began and ended in 2009.

Writing and music
Truth or Square was written by Luke Brookshier, Nate Cash, Steven Banks, and Paul Tibbitt. The writers have described the television movie as "Seinfeld-esque" that parodies the recycled flashback episodes seen in Seinfeld, Friends and other U.S. shows. The featured song, "We've Got Scurvy", was sung by American singer and actress Pink.

Cast
Truth or Square stars most of the series' main cast members including Tom Kenny, Bill Fagerbakke, Rodger Bumpass, Clancy Brown, Mr. Lawrence, Jill Talley, and Carolyn Lawrence (Mary Jo Catlett and Lori Alan's characters both appear, but they do not speak). In addition to the series' cast, it features Rosario Dawson, Eddie Deezen, Craig Ferguson, Will Ferrell, Tina Fey, LeBron James, Triumph the Insult Comic Dog (Robert Smigel), and Robin Williams as guest actors appearing as themselves in the live-action sequences, while Ricky Gervais provided an uncredited vocal cameo as the narrator. Nickelodeon animation president Brown Johnson said "Over the past decade, SpongeBob has become one of the most beloved characters in television history[...] And we're excited to cap off the year's celebration with this star-studded special anniversary event."

Directing and animating
Andrew Overtoom, supervising director, Alan Smart, and Tom Yasumi served as the special's animation directors while Luke Brookshier and Nate Cash handled the storyboard direction. It was a part of the series' tenth anniversary celebration.

The title sequence of SpongeBob for the special was made exclusively for the series' tenth anniversary. It was animated in stop-motion animation, with Cee Lo Green performing the theme. Mark Caballero, Seamus Walsh and Chris Finnegan of Screen Novelties animated its opening titles. Finnegan claimed that the crew were "thrill[ed]" to do the title sequence because "the original title sequence is so recognizable and everyone seen it over and over and it's so great in its own way." Executive producer and the episode's writer Paul Tibbitt said "We don't just want to redraw it [the original title sequence], we want it to be something special and different[...] So we thought we would do it in three dimensions[...]" Nickelodeon animation president Brown Johnson lauded the new title sequence and said it is "SO great!" Some traditional animation on scraps of brown paper are intermixed into the stop-motion.

Tibbitt said that the "biggest surprise" for him in the new title sequence was "the treatment of Painty the Pirate in the beginning" as seen in a fortune-teller machine. Mark Caballero, one of its animators, explained "our idea was like our goal is like the more disturbing, the better because I don't think there is a fortune telling machine out there that doesn't disturb when you see it. Tibbitt said "it was a great idea[...] I was just expecting maybe a 3D version of the painting but we got something totally different and it's very cool."

Release
In a press release, Nickelodeon officially announced the special "event" on October 13, 2009. According to the network, the special include "SpongeBob's first visit to the Krusty Krab as a baby, a vintage Krusty Krab TV commercial, how SpongeBob found his beloved pineapple house, and the time that SpongeBob and Sandy got married!" Prior to the official announcement of the television special, Entertainment Weekly broke the news by releasing a clip featuring a scene where SpongeBob and Sandy getting married.

It originally aired on Nickelodeon in the United States on November 6, 2009, as one of many SpongeBob TV events to air that year (with April featuring "SpongeBob vs. The Big One", and July featuring "The Ultimate SpongeBob SpongeBash" marathon, Square Roots: The Story of SpongeBob SquarePants documentary, and a special episode titled "To SquarePants or Not to SquarePants").

Marketing
In late 2009, Burger King released tie-in toys based on the episode, featuring the characters in block shapes.

A book adaptation of the special, titled The Great Escape!, was also released. The book was written by Emily Sollinger, published by Simon Spotlight/Nickelodeon, and was released on September 8, 2009. Another tie-in book to the special was also released. The book titled Good Times! was written by Erica David, illustrated by the Artifacts Group, and published by Simon Spotlight/Nickelodeon. Good Times! was first released on September 8, 2009, then re-released in 2011.

On November 10, 2009, it was released on a DVD compilation of the same name in the United States and Canada, on November 16, 2009, in region 2, and on October 29, 2009, in region 4. The DVD consists of five season six episodes, a short called Behind the Scenes of the SpongeBob Opening, and karaoke-mode songs: "F.U.N.", "Campfire Song", and "We've Got Scurvy". It was also released in the series' season six DVD compilation. On June 4, 2019, "Truth or Square" was released on the SpongeBob SquarePants: The Next 100 Episodes DVD, alongside all the episodes of seasons six through nine. On April 28, 2020, "Truth or Square" was released on the SpongeBob SquarePants: Bikini Bottom Bash DVD.

Reception

Ratings
The premiere of Truth or Square on Friday, November 6 drew 7.7 million total viewers, ranking as basic cable's number-one entertainment show for the week. It was also ranked as the week's number one program among children in the demographic groups ages 6–11 and 2–11.

Critical response

Truth or Square received generally polarized reviews from critics and fans, and was criticized mainly due to the Patchy the Pirate segments, with many comparing them to the segments from "Christmas Who", "The Sponge Who Could Fly", and "Ugh". Paul Mavis from DVD Talk said "Truth or Square is a strange mix of some truly memorable animated SpongeBob moments interrupted unfortunately by the largely unfunny Patchy the Pirate segments." He added "All of those amusing moments in Truth or Square, along with the Charlie Brown Christmas ending, make one forget the patchy Patchy segments in Truth or Square." Roy Hrab of DVD Verdict gave the episode a negative review saying "Wow... This is without a doubt the lamest SpongeBob episode I have ever seen[...] In fact, nothing interesting happens at all. The Patchy interludes and reliance on cameos merely draws attention to the episode's lack of substance."

However, the special did garner some positive reception. Nancy Basile of the About.com gave the special positive reviews and wrote, "I had doubts that the recent Truth or Square special of SpongeBob SquarePants would be funny or clever. I was quite wrong." She added that "My kids and I were mesmerized." Jose Strike of the Animation World Network positively reacted to the special and wrote "Truth or Square is a major treat; in fact, I'm so happy I think I'll drop on the deck and flop like a fish..." Ian Jane of DVD Talk said "Truth or Square isn't your typical episode, as it mixes up a lot of live action material in with the more traditional animated sequences to very unusual effect." He added "[...]but there's enough here in terms of the gags and the jokes that even if it's not a classic episode, it's still one worth seeing." Nickelodeon animation president Brown Johnson said that the special is her favorite among the series.

In 2010, Tom Kenny won at the 37th Annie Awards for the Best Voice Acting in a Television Production category for his performance as the voice of SpongeBob SquarePants in the special.

Video game

The video game SpongeBob's Truth or Square that was based on the SpongeBob SquarePants television special was released for PlayStation Portable, Wii, Xbox 360, and Nintendo DS. The game was first announced by THQ on May 21, 2009, and was originally titled SpongeBob SquarePants: Happiness Squared before being changed early in development. It was published by THQ, developed by Heavy Iron Studios, and was released on October 26, 2009, in North America.

See also

SpongeBob's Big Birthday Blowout

References

External links

 

SpongeBob SquarePants
SpongeBob SquarePants episodes
2009 television films
2009 animated films
2009 films
2009 American television episodes
2000s American animated films
American children's animated adventure films
American children's animated comedy films
Animated films based on animated series
American films with live action and animation
Nickelodeon animated films
Anniversary television episodes
2000s English-language films